Narbir Singh Yadav is a politician and a member of the Bhartiya Janata Party. He is an active social and political reformer. Currently, he is Vice-President, BJP, Haryana and was Cabinet Minister (2014–19), Government of Haryana for Department of Public Works (B&R), Haryana  and Department of Public Health Engineering (Water Supply and Sanitation), Haryana. He won as BJP candidate from Badshahpur constituency during the 2014 Haryana Legislative Assembly election.

Early life 
Mr. Singh was born in Rewari which was a city in South Punjab (now in Haryana) on 2 April 1961. Mr. Singh is a grandson of Mohar Singh Yadav who was an M.L.C. in Punjab state before partition of India and Pakistan in 1942. His father Mahavir Singh Yadav was also a former cabinet Minister in the State of Haryana.

Political career 
He has successfully contested Legislative elections from Jatusana (Haryana) in 1987 and Sohna (Haryana) in 1996. He has previously held the portfolios of State Home Minister in 1987 and Transport, Food & Supply and Cooperation Minister in 1996 in the Government of Haryana. He became the youngest elected representative in the country to hold the office of State Home Ministry at age 26. He also had additional charge of Sports and Printing & Stationery ministry in 1996. He unsuccessfully contested Lok Sabha election from Gurgaon in 2009.

Career graph
1982 – Director, Central Cooperative Bank, Gurgaon
1983 – Sarpanch, Village Gairatpur Bass
1984 – Chairman, Market Committee, Sohna
1987 – MLA (Jatusana constituency)
1987 – State Home Minister, Government of Haryana youngest  minister at age of 25? which is record and holds till now
1996 – MLA (Sohna constituency)
1996 – Food & Civil Supplies, Transport and Cooperative Minister, Government of Haryana
2014 onward – Chairman, Rao Mohar Singh College of Education, Behrampur
2014 onward - Vice President, BJP Haryana.
2014 - Cabinet Minister, Government of Haryana for Department of Public Works (B&R), Haryana Official website and Department of Public Health Engineering (Water Supply and Sanitation), Haryana

References

Living people
People from Rewari
1961 births
State cabinet ministers of Haryana
Haryana MLAs 2014–2019
Bharatiya Janata Party politicians from Haryana
Haryana Janhit Congress politicians
Haryana Vikas Party politicians
Lok Dal politicians